In the mathematical theory of harmonic analysis, the Riesz transforms are a family of generalizations of the Hilbert transform to Euclidean spaces of dimension d > 1.  They are a type of singular integral operator, meaning that they are given by a convolution of one function with another function having a singularity at the origin.  Specifically, the Riesz transforms of a complex-valued function ƒ on Rd are defined by

for j = 1,2,...,d.  The constant cd is a dimensional normalization given by

where ωd−1 is the volume of the unit (d − 1)-ball.  The limit is written in various ways, often as a principal value, or as a convolution with the tempered distribution

The Riesz transforms arises in the study of differentiability properties of harmonic potentials in potential theory and harmonic analysis.  In particular, they arise in the proof of the Calderón-Zygmund inequality .

Multiplier properties

The Riesz transforms are given by a Fourier multiplier.  Indeed, the Fourier transform of Rjƒ is given by

In this form, the Riesz transforms are seen to be generalizations of the Hilbert transform.  The kernel is a distribution which is homogeneous of degree zero.  A particular consequence of this last observation is that the Riesz transform defines a bounded linear operator from L2(Rd) to itself.

This homogeneity property can also be stated more directly without the aid of the Fourier transform. If σs is the dilation on Rd by the scalar s, that is σsx = sx, then σs defines an action on functions via pullback:

The Riesz transforms commute with σs:

Similarly, the Riesz transforms commute with translations.  Let τa be the translation on Rd along the vector a; that is, τa(x) = x + a.  Then

For the final property, it is convenient to regard the Riesz transforms as a single vectorial entity Rƒ = (R1ƒ,...,Rdƒ).  Consider a rotation ρ in Rd.  The rotation acts on spatial variables, and thus on functions via pullback.  But it also can act on the spatial vector Rƒ.  The final transformation property asserts that the Riesz transform is equivariant with respect to these two actions; that is,

These three properties in fact characterize the Riesz transform in the following sense.  Let T=(T1,...,Td) be a d-tuple of bounded linear operators from L2(Rd) to L2(Rd) such that

 T commutes with all dilations and translations.
 T is equivariant with respect to rotations.

Then, for some constant c, T = cR.

Relationship with the Laplacian
Somewhat imprecisely, the Riesz transforms of  give the first partial derivatives of a solution of the equation

where Δ is the Laplacian. Thus the Riesz transform of  can be written as:

In particular, one should also have

so that the Riesz transforms give a way of recovering information about the entire Hessian of a function from knowledge of only its Laplacian.

This is now made more precise. Suppose that  is a Schwartz function.  Then indeed by the explicit form of the Fourier multiplier, one has

The identity is not generally true in the sense of distributions.  For instance, if  is a tempered distribution such that , then one can only conclude that

for some polynomial .

See also
 Hilbert Transform
 Poisson kernel
 Riesz potential

References

 .
 .
 .
 .

Harmonic analysis
Integral transforms
Potential theory
Singular integrals